Statistics of the Scottish Football League in season 1911–12.

Scottish League Division One

Scottish League Division Two

See also
1911–12 in Scottish football

References

 
1911-12